Muricopsis gorii is a species of small sea snail, a marine gastropod mollusks in the family Muricidae, the rock snails.

This species was first described in 2012 based on specimens from the south of the island of São Tomé, São Tomé and Príncipe.

Description
The length of the shell attains 8.6 mm.

References

Muricidae
Invertebrates of São Tomé and Príncipe
Endemic fauna of São Tomé Island
Gastropods described in 2012